The 2010–11 Elite Ice Hockey League season started on 25 August 2010, with the annual Charity Shield match between Coventry Blaze and Belfast Giants. 
The game took place at 7.30 pm on 25 August 2010. The match ended in 4–2 victory for the Giants.

The League proper started on 4 September,.  Two new teams joined for the 2010–11 season- the Braehead Clan and the Dundee Stars.

Sky Sports broadcast one live game every Friday, and also showed the Belfast Giants v Nottingham Panthers opening night game live followed by a live game once every month.

The EIHL appointed an official mascot called Rory, who wears a light blue hockey jersey and the number 00.

Teams

Elite League Table

GP=Games Played
W=Win,
L=Lose,
OTW=Over Time Loses,
OTL=Shoot Out Loses,
Pts=Points,

Elite League playoffs

The end of season playoffs were held at the National Ice Centre in Nottingham during the weekend of 2 and 3 April 2011.

The weekend began with the biggest rivalry in the game, with the Sheffield Steelers playing the Nottingham Panthers. Sheffield took an early 2-goal advantage, but Panthers fought back, and went on to steal the game 4–3 in overtime, Robert Lachowicz scoring the winning goal. The second semi-final between Cardiff Devils and Belfast Giants saw Cardiff win by 4 goals to 1, seen by many as an upset, as Belfast were fancied to take the crown.

The title was won by the Nottingham Panthers after defeating Cardiff Devils 5–4 in a closely fought final, where again Nottingham came from two goals down.

Challenge Cup

 NOTE: Some Cup games double up as League games due to scheduling constraints.

Top 2 in each group qualify for Semi-finals

(Q) means teams has qualified for Semi-finals

Group A

Group B

Challenge Cup Knockout Stages

 The Knockout Stages will be played over 2-Legs, Home and Away. (Aggregate Scores shown, First and Second Leg scores in brackets)

Aladdin 20–20 Cup

The success of the Aladdin 20–20 Cup during the previous season led the EIHL to schedule a second such contest. The second 20–20 Cup took place in Nottingham on Saturday, 12 March 2011 and included four teams: the Nottingham Panthers, Sheffield Steelers, Coventry Blaze and Braehead Clan.

The Braehead Clan captured their first EIHL trophy, defeating the host Nottingham Panthers by a score of 3–0. Braehead goaltender J.F. Parras kept a clean sheet in the final and Adam Walker, Ryan Campbell and captain Brendan Cook all scored.

Boston Bruins Select Game

On Saturday, 2 October, the Belfast Giants select side, made of Elite League Players played a Boston Bruins select side at the Odyssey Arena in Belfast. Boston won the match 5–1.

Period 1

No scoring

Period 2

Goals

Penalties

Period 3

Goals

Penalties

Elite Ice Hockey League seasons
1
United